Gandarias is a surname. Notable people with the surname include:

Andrés Gandarias (born 1943), Spanish road bicycle racer
Sofía Gandarias (1957–2016), Spanish painter

See also
Bouea macrophylla, commonly known as gandaria in English, a species of flowering plant native to Southeast Asia